Elphinstone is a village in East Lothian, Scotland.

Etymology
There is a fairy story about a witch called Meg who is supposed to have been involved in the naming of the village. Meg had servants who were elves and she was cruel to them. One day she went to the burn inbetween Elphinstone and Ormiston and ate in her carriage, telling her servants not to disturb her. One elf broke into her carriage once she fell asleep and stole some of her leftovers. Meg, however, awoke and caught him. She took him back to Elphinstone and trapped him in her stone or "Meg's chuck". Hence the name Elph (elf) in stone. Other theories about the origin of the name are from the Anglo Saxon elfenne added to "stone", a reference to hard flint-like stones which were supposed to be used as shot by elves and fairies and which are found on the land around the village. A more prosaic origin is in the Gallo-Latin personal name Alphinus. The earliest mention of the village was in a deed drawn up by Alams de Swinton around 1235 which mentions "homines (serfs) of Elfinstun".

It may be worth noting that Elffin was a relatively common name in the Brythonic Hen Ogledd, with three separate people of that name appearing in the genealogies: Elfin son of Urien, Elffin son of Owain and Elffin son of Gwyddno, the last of which also appearing as Taliesin's foster father in the mythological stories of his life.

History
The Protestant reformer George Wishart was brought to Elphinstone by Patrick Hepburn, 3rd Earl of Bothwell en route to St Andrews where he was tried and burned at the stake on 1 March 1546.

Between 2011 and 2018 the population of the village increased from 520 to 590  and it has basic amenities, including a primary school, a community centre, a newsagent, and a miners welfare club.

Landmarks and economy

Located half a mile west of the village, Elphinstone Tower, built in the 13th to 15th century, is a former five-storey tower, now a ruin, with only the lower level remaining.  The Elphinstone clan held the lands of Elphinstone and took their name from their lands.

Mines owned by the Edinburgh Colliery Company, Limited were formerly the main employer in the village. Many of the houses in the village were owned by the company. now Inveresk Research International is one of the main employers in the area. Elphinstone Tower Farm produces cereal crops.

References

External links

Website of Elphinstone Primary School
East Lothian Council Report on Elphinstone village

Villages in East Lothian